The 1972 NCAA University Division Swimming and Diving Championships were contested in March 1972 at Crandall Pool at the United States Military Academy in West Point, New York at the 49th annual NCAA-sanctioned swim meet to determine the team and individual national champions of University Division men's collegiate swimming and diving in the United States.

Indiana again topped the team standings, the Hoosiers' fifth consecutive and fifth overall title.

Team standings
Note: Top 10 only
(H) = Hosts
(DC) = Defending champions
Full results

See also
List of college swimming and diving teams

References

NCAA Division I Men's Swimming and Diving Championships
NCAA University Division Swimming And Diving Championships
NCAA University Division Swimming And Diving Championships